Auckland Suburbs was a parliamentary electorate in Auckland, New Zealand from 1928 to 1946.

Population centres
In the 1927 electoral redistribution, the North Island gained a further electorate from the South Island due to faster population growth. Five electorates were abolished, two former electorates were re-established, and three electorates, including Auckland Suburbs, were created for the first time.

History
The electorate was formed for the 1928 general election, and was only ever held by the Labour Party. It was represented by one Member of Parliament; Rex Mason, who had previously represented Eden.

Mayor James Gunson stood unsuccessfully for Reform in 1928.

The electorate was abolished in 1946.

Members of Parliament
From 1928 to 1946, Auckland Suburbs existed as a single-member electorate.

Election results

1943 election

1938 election

1935 election

1931 election

1928 election

Notes

References

Historical electorates of New Zealand
1928 establishments in New Zealand
1946 disestablishments in New Zealand
Politics of the Auckland Region